Orthomorpha coarctata, the long-flange millipede, is a widely introduced species of Polydesmidan millipede of the family Paradoxosomatidae. It is presumed native to Southeast Asia but due to transport by humans occurs in tropical and sub-tropical areas throughout the world, including the Hawaiian Islands, the West Indies, Gulf Coast of North America, and the Galápagos Islands.

Description
Males range from 14.5–20.5 mm in length and 1.5 to 2.7 mm wide while females are somewhat larger ranging from 16.5–27.5 mm long, and 1.6–3.2 mm wide. O. coarctata can be distinguished from Oxidus gracilis, another widely introduced Asian millipede, by having proportionally longer and pointier paranota (lateral keels) on mid-body segments and longer gonopods (male reproductive appendages).

O. coarctata is unique within the genus Orthomorpha in that the gonopods have a single, simple tip, while other species have two or three lobes. This distinction has led some authors to place O. coarctata in a separate, monotypic genus, Asiomorpha.

References

External links

Polydesmida
Animals described in 1860
Millipedes of North America
Millipedes of Asia